Galene can refer to: 

Galene (mythology), one of the Nereids
427 Galene, a main belt asteroid 
Galene (crab), a genus of crabs
 Galene, a genus of Algae,

See also
 Galen (disambiguation)
 Galena (disambiguation)
 Galina, a given name